Nick Ross (born 1947) is a British radio and television presenter.

Nick or Nicholas Ross may also refer to:

 Nick Ross (footballer, born 1862) (1862–1894), Scottish footballer, played for Hearts, Preston NE and Everton
 Nick Ross (footballer, born 1991), Scottish footballer
 Nick Ross (ice hockey) (born 1989), Canadian ice hockey player, currently plays for San Antonio Rampage in the AHL
 Nick Ross (field hockey) (born 1990), New Zealand field hockey player
 Nicholas Ross (cricketer) (born 1947), Scottish cricketer
Nicholas Ross (died 1967), American bookseller and husband of Adelaide Phillpotts